Chakrala, is a village located in the Mianwali District in the Punjab province of Pakistan. Chakrala is also a Union Council, (administrative subdivision) of Mianwali Tehsil.Chakrala is the oldest and the largest village a seat of Hindu Tribe Chikar, of Mianwali District in the Punjab province of Pakistan.It was captured by Local Muslims in the 13th century by the aid of invaders from the North-western tribes. Chakrala is located 10 miles (16 km) away from the Mianwali Talagang road at 32°6'0N 72°22'0E]. The area has been predominantly inhabited by Awan tribes for the last six centuries. During 13th century Sadar karabogha Khan head of Khattaks along with Niazi and Awan tribes conquered the area's at the west Bank of river Indus. Awan had their first settlement in Kohat and Mianwali areas. Later during 16th century these advanced towards eastren side of Indus river including Attock, Chakwal, Shah pur and Sargodha and many Awan clan shifted to new settlement. Chakrala is the birthplace of lance naik Sher Shah Awan VC (Victoria Cross). Chakrala village is part of Awankari Region. Awankari is an exclusive area of Awan tirbe between Mianwali, Attack, Chakwal, Khushab and Jhelum Districts. Awankari is also dialect of Awan tribe of Awankari Region.

Notable residents
 Sher Shah Awan (1917-1945), British Indian Army soldier and recipient of Victoria Cross

Location
Chakrala is located at 32°49' N, 71°52' E, over the Potohar.

References

Populated places in Mianwali District
Union councils of Mianwali District